The surgeon general of the United States is the operational head of the United States Public Health Service Commissioned Corps (PHSCC) and thus the leading spokesperson on matters of public health in the federal government of the United States. The Surgeon General's office and staff are known as the Office of the Surgeon General (OSG), which is housed within the Office of the Assistant Secretary for Health.

The U.S. surgeon general is nominated by the president of the United States and confirmed by the Senate. The surgeon general must be appointed from individuals who are members of the regular corps of the U.S. Public Health Service and have specialized training or significant experience in public health programs. However, there is no time requirement for membership in the Public Health Service before holding the office of the Surgeon General, and nominees traditionally were appointed as members of the Public Health Service and as Surgeon General at the same time. The Surgeon General serves a four-year term of office and, depending on whether the current assistant secretary for health is a commissioned corps officer, is either the senior or next-most senior uniformed officer of the commissioned corps, holding the rank of vice admiral. The current surgeon general is Vice Admiral Vivek Murthy.

Responsibilities 
The surgeon general reports to the assistant secretary for health (ASH). The ASH may be a four-star admiral in the commissioned corps, and serves as the principal advisor to the secretary of health and human services on public health and scientific issues. The Surgeon General is the overall head of the commissioned corps, a 6,500-member cadre of uniformed health professionals who are on call 24 hours a day and can be dispatched by the secretary of HHS or by the assistant secretary for health in the event of a public health emergency.

The Surgeon General is also the ultimate award authority for several public health awards and decorations, the highest of which that can be directly awarded is the Surgeon General's Medallion (the highest award bestowed by board action is the Public Health Service Distinguished Service Medal). The Surgeon General also has many informal duties, such as educating the American public about health issues and advocating healthy lifestyle choices.

The office also periodically issues health warnings. Perhaps the best known example of this is the surgeon general's warning label that has been present on all packages of American tobacco cigarettes since 1966. A similar health warning has appeared on alcoholic beverages labels since 1988.

History 
In 1798, Congress established the Marine Hospital Fund, a network of hospitals that cared for sick and disabled seamen. The Marine Hospital Fund was reorganized along military lines in 1870 and became the Marine Hospital Service—the predecessor to today's United States Public Health Service. The service became a separate bureau of the Treasury Department with its own staff, administration, headquarters in Washington, D.C, and the position of supervising surgeon (later surgeon general, where in this context, the adjective "general" following the noun meaning widespread or overall, not military rank).

After 141 years under the Treasury Department, the Service came under the Federal Security Agency in 1939, then the Department of Health, Education, and Welfare (HEW) in 1953, and finally the United States Department of Health and Human Services (HHS).

Prior to 1970, the surgeon general was traditionally selected from career uniformed officers. Today, the surgeon general is usually selected from the civilian community, who aligns more closely with the president's political party. The office is not a particularly powerful one, and has little direct statutory impact on policy-making, but Surgeons General are often vocal advocates of precedent-setting, far-sighted, unconventional, or even unpopular health policies.
 On January 11, 1964, Luther Terry published a landmark report saying that smoking may be hazardous to health, sparking nationwide anti-smoking efforts. Terry and his committee defined cigarette smoking of nicotine as not an addiction. The committee itself consisted largely of physicians who themselves smoked. This report went uncorrected for 24 years.
 In 1986, C. Everett Koop's report on AIDS called for some form of AIDS education in the early grades of elementary school, and gave full support for using condoms for disease prevention. He also resisted pressure from the Reagan administration to report that abortion was psychologically harmful to women, stating he believed it was a moral issue rather than one concerning the public health.
 In 1994, Joycelyn Elders spoke at a United Nations conference on AIDS. She was asked whether it would be appropriate to promote masturbation as a means of preventing young people from engaging in riskier forms of sexual activity. She replied, "I think that it is part of human sexuality, and perhaps it should be taught." Elders also spoke in favor of studying drug legalization. In a reference to the national abortion issue, she said, "We really need to get over this love affair with the fetus and start worrying about children." She was fired by President Bill Clinton in December 1994.

The U.S. Army, Navy, and Air Force also have officers overseeing medical matters in their respective services who hold the title Surgeon General, of their respective services, while the surgeon general of the United States is surgeon general of the entire country as a whole.

The insignia of the surgeon general, and the USPHS, use the caduceus as opposed to the Rod of Asclepius.

Service rank 
The surgeon general is a commissioned officer in the U.S. Public Health Service Commissioned Corps, one of the eight uniformed services of the United States, and by law holds the rank of vice admiral. Officers of the Public Health Service Commissioned Corps are classified as non-combatants, but can be subjected to the Uniform Code of Military Justice (UCMJ) and the Geneva Conventions when designated by the commander-in-chief as a military force or if they are detailed or assigned to work with the armed forces. Officers of the commissioned corps, including the surgeon general, wear uniforms that are modeled after uniforms of the United States Navy and the United States Coast Guard, except that the commissioning devices, buttons, and insignia are unique. Officers in the U.S. Public Health Service wear unique devices that are similar to U.S. Navy staff corps officers (e.g., Navy Medical Service Corps, Supply Corps, etc.).

The only surgeon general to actually hold the rank of a four-star admiral was David Satcher (born 1941, served 1998–2002). This was because he served simultaneously in the positions of surgeon general (three-star) and assistant secretary for health (which is a four-star office). John Maynard Woodworth (1837–1879, served 1871–1879), the first holder of the office as "Supervising Surgeon."

List of surgeons general of the United States

See also 

 Chief Medical Officer (Ireland)
 Chief Medical Officer (United Kingdom)
 Chief Public Health Officer of Canada
 Medical Officer of Health
 Surgeon General
 Surgeon General of the United States Air Force
 Surgeon General of the United States Army
 Surgeon General of the United States Navy

Notes

References

External links 
 Official website of the U.S. Surgeon General
 Previous Surgeons General
 Reports of the Surgeon General from the National Library of Medicine's "Profiles in Science"

Office of the Assistant Secretary for Health
 
United States Department of Health and Human Services officials
United States Public Health Service
United States Public Health Service Commissioned Corps